Jonathan "Johnny" Read (born 2 February 1998) is an English cricketer who played for Yorkshire County Cricket Club. Read is a right-handed batsmen who also keeps wicket. Johnny was the Yorkshire leagues, wicket keeper of the year in 2018 with 33 ‘victims’ including 27 catches and 6 stumpings. A batting average in that season of 8.75.

External links
 

1998 births
Living people
English cricketers
Cricketers from Scarborough, North Yorkshire
Yorkshire cricketers
English cricketers of the 21st century